QED may refer to:

Mathematics and science
 Q.E.D., used at the end of a mathematical proof
 Quantum electrodynamics, a field in particle physics
 QED manifesto and project, a database of mathematical knowledge
 QED: The Strange Theory of Light and Matter, a 1985 physics book by Richard Feynman

Computing and electronics
 QEMU Enhanced Disk, a deprecated disk image format for machine emulation and virtualization
 QED (text editor), a 1960s line-oriented editor
 Quantum Effect Devices, a microprocessor design company

Arts, entertainment, media

Literature
Quod Erat Demonstrandum, a 1903 novel by Gertrude Stein
 Q.E.D. (novel), a 1930 mystery novel by Lynn Brock
 Q.E.D. (manga), a 1997 manga by Motohiro Katou

Albums
 QED (band), a 1980s Australian band
 Q.E.D. (Terje Rypdal album), 1993
 Q.E.D. (Jim Allchin album)
 QED Records or Emanem Records

Stage and screen
 Quod Erat Demonstrandum (film), a 2013 Romanian drama film
 QED (play), a 2001 play by Peter Parnell about Richard Feynman
 QED International, a film company

Television 
 KQED (TV), public television station in San Francisco, California, USA; also known as "QED"
 Q.E.D. (U.S. TV series)
 Q.E.D. (UK TV series)
 WQED (TV), public television station in Pittsburgh, Pennsylvania, USA; also known as "QED"

Radio
 KQED-FM (88.5), an NPR radio station in San Francisco, California, USA; also known as "QED"
 WQED-FM (89.3), an NPR radio station in Pittsburgh, Pennsylvania, USA; also known as "QED"

Other uses
 Granville Gee Bee R-6, named "Q.E.D.", a 1930s racing monoplane
 QED: Question, Explore, Discover, annual skeptical conference held in Manchester, UK
 Quami Ekta Dal, a regional political party in India
 Quiet Electric Drive, a US Navy program to develop technologies for silent maritime propulsion

See also

 
 KQED (disambiguation), including callsigns KQED -- QED in zone K
 WQED (disambiguation), including callsigns WQED -- QED in zone W
 CQED (disambiguation)